Errogie is a small linear settlement situated at the north east end of Loch Mhòr in Inverness-shire, Scottish Highlands and is in the Scottish council area of Highland.

References

Populated places in Inverness committee area